Sean Sheunesu Fusire (born 31 May 2005) is an English professional footballer who plays as a centre midfielder for Sheffield Wednesday.

Career

Sheffield Wednesday
Fusire joined Sheffield Wednesday at the age of 9 and would be a regular for the clubs U18 and U21 side. He plays centrally or outwide in midfield as well as playing right wing back. He signed his first pro contract on 9 December 2022. He would make his senior debut against Fleetwood Town in an FA Cup replay on 7 February 2023. Following injuries in the squad, he would join the first team for the remainder of the season along with fellow youngsters Rio Shipston and Adam Alimi-Adetoro who have all made their debut during the season.

Career statistics

References

2005 births
Living people
English footballers
Sheffield Wednesday F.C. players